National Tertiary Route 403, or just Route 403 (or ) is a National Road Route of Costa Rica, located in the Cartago province.

Description
In Cartago province the route covers Alvarado canton (Cervantes district).

References

Highways in Costa Rica